Solomon Gutstein (born June 18, 1934) is an author and authority on Illinois Real Estate Law and he is the first ordained Rabbi to serve as Alderman (1975-1979) on the Chicago City Council of Chicago, Illinois.

Early life and education 

Gutstein was born to Rabbi Morris Gutstein and Golda Gutstein in Newport, Rhode Island. Gutstein moved with his parents and brother, Naftali Gutstein, to Chicago in 1943. He received his A.B. with honors from the University of Chicago in 1953 and his Juris Doctor (J.D.) in 1956. From 1955 to 1956, Gutstein was associate editor of the University of Chicago Law Review. While at law school, he took night classes at the Hebrew Theological College, and on July 31, 1956, Gutstein was ordained as a Rabbi by an Orthodox Judaism Beit Din in New York City consisting of Rabbi Nathan Dublinsky, Rabbi Leifa Wiesblum, and Rabbi Eliyahu Huberland. On September 3, 1961, Gutstein married Carol G. Feinhandler, who changed her name to Carol F. Gutstein.

Career and city council service 

Though Gutstein has officiated life cycle events as a Rabbi, he never intended to pursue a career in theology. Gutstein started his legal career as an associate for Schratsky, Gould, and Ratner from 1956 through 1961. Gutstein then left the firm and for the next 30 years was either a partner or principal in his own firm.

Always interested in politics, and encouraged by his politically active friend, Seymour Simon, Gutstein ran for and won a seat as Alderman of the City Council in 1975, representing the 40th ward of Chicago. At the time, the 40th Ward encompassed disparate ethnic neighborhoods on Chicago's northwest side, bordered by Peterson to the north, Kedzie to the west, and reaching as far as Irving Park to the south and Clark to the east. Though Gutstein did not emphasize his stature as Rabbi in his campaign, Mayor Richard J. Daley and the Cook County Democratic Party ("Democratic Party" or "the Party") supported his candidacy as the ward had been predominantly Jewish. In winning a seat on the Chicago City Council, Gutstein became the first ordained Rabbi to serve as Alderman.

Gutstein held regular walk-in office hours as well as monthly town meetings and zoning sessions in a various areas of the Ward. Gutstein sponsored the first residential permit parking ordinance and maneuvered successfully to bring out of committee a previously stalled ordinance curtailing towing abuse so the law could be immediately considered and passed by the council. As he championed legislation touching on religious issues, such as Sunday burial and a city Eruv, Gutstein also solicited input from Chicago rabbinical leaders.

Gutstein lost the 1979 campaign in a close race owing largely to his loss of Democratic Party support.

Gutstein would return to the City Council for one night on December 1, 1987, following the death of Chicago Mayor Harold Washington on November 25, 1987. In recognition of his stature as a Rabbi, Gutstein was invited to give the opening prayer invocation of the contentious special City Council election of Eugene Sawyer as the city's 53rd mayor of Chicago. He cited the words of the Jewish Hebrew prayer, Sim Shalom, translated as "Grant Peace."

Gutstein resumed his legal practice full-time after his term ended as Alderman. In 1983, Gutstein established himself as a leading practitioner of Illinois Real Estate Law after writing a two volume treatise for Lawyers Cooperative Publishing. Gutstein would continue to build on his comprehensive practical legal guide and subsequently published new publications.  In 1992, Gutstein merged his legal practice into Tenney and Bentley, LLC, where he now continues his real estate and business transaction practice. In addition to his practice and publications, he lectures extensively on real estate. Gutstein was a lecturer in business law at the Booth School of Business of the University of Chicago and an adjunct professor in real estate at John Marshall Law School (Chicago). He became a Business mediator in 2012.  He is a member of the Illinois Bar and the Federal District Court Trial Bar for the Northern District of Illinois and is admitted to practice before the U. S. Court of Appeals for the 7th Circuit and the United States Supreme Court.

Personal life 

Gutstein was married to Carol F. Gutstein until she died in 2014. They had four sons.

Works 

Books
 The Practice Systems Library: Illinois Real Estate, Parts 1 and 2, Lawyers Cooperative Publishing, 1983, updated through 1995.
 Illinois Practice Guide: Illinois Real Estate, Volumes 1 and 2, West Group, 1996, updated through 2000.
 Illinois Practice Series: Real Estate, Volumes 14 through 16 (co-authored with Eileen Murphy), Thompson Reuters, 2000, updated through 2008, updates co-authored with Joshua A. Gutstein 2009 through 2014.
 Judaism in Art (co-authored with Rabbi Morris A. Gutstein), Gutstein Family Trust, 1994.
 Illinois Construction Law (co-authored with Erwin Steiner), Professional Education Systems, Inc., 1981.
 Illinois Construction Law Update '82 (co-authored with Erwin Steiner with Erwin Steiner and Stanley P. Sklar), Professional Education Systems, Inc., 1982.
 Illinois Construction Law 1984 (co-authored with Stanley Sklar), Professional Education Systems, Inc., 1984.

Articles
 Post-Mortem Methods of Avoiding Probate, Winter 1972–73, Volume 22 No. 3, The Decalogue Journal
 Civil Enforceability of Religious Antenuptial Agreements, Volume 23 No. 1, Autumn 1955, The University of Chicago Law Review
 Commercial Real Estate Property Practice Chapter 4: Form of Taking and/or Holding Title to Real Estate, Illinois Institute for Continuing Legal Education (1972)

References 

1934 births
Living people
Chicago City Council members
American Orthodox rabbis
Illinois lawyers
Writers from Newport, Rhode Island
University of Chicago alumni
American legal writers
20th-century American non-fiction writers
20th-century American male writers
American male non-fiction writers
21st-century American Jews